Heraeus may refer to:
Heraeus, German tech group
Heraeus (bug), genus of bugs
Heraeus (mythology), son of Lycaon.